Phyllonorycter bascanaula is a moth of the family Gracillariidae. It is known from Java, Indonesia.

The larvae feed on Mucuna pruriens. They probably mine the leaves of their host plant.

References

bascanaula
Moths of Asia
Moths described in 1936